Gary Hines may refer to:

 Gary Hines (politician), Canadian politician in the Nova Scotia House of Assembly 
 Gary Hines (handballer) (born 1984), American handball player